The eponymous album Cuff the Duke is the band's second full-length release. Recorded and mixed in Toronto at The Woodshed, Hallamusic and Chemical Sound. This album contains a re-recording of the track Anti-Social which first appeared on Life Stories for Minimum Wage.

The album was reissued on vinyl in 2018.

Track listing
"The Future Hangs" – 3:46
"I Really Want to Help You" – 3:38
"Take My Money and Run" – 2:55
"No Sleep, No Heat" – 5:36
"The Ballad of Poor John Henry" – 4:08
"Anti-Social" – 3:48
"There Was a Time" – 4:26
"Belgium or Peru" – 3:21
"Meet You on the Other Side" – 4:16
"A Long Night My Love" – 1:38
"It's Over" – 5:34

Personnel
Wayne Petti - vocals, guitar, harmonica, piano 
Jeff Peers - guitar, Moog, organ
Paul Lowman - bass, piano, vocals 
Matt Faris - drums, percussion
Isla Craig - backing vocals
Jay Ball - backing vocals
Paul Aucoin - producer, engineer, mixing (3, 5, 7, 9), string and horn arrangements
Julie Penner - strings
Owen Pallett - strings
Michael Olsen - strings
James Heidebrecht - mixing
Chris Shreenan - engineer
Dyck and Francois Turenne - engineer
Noah Mintz - mastering

References

2005 albums
Cuff the Duke albums